Best FM is both Malaysia's first private radio station (not the first commercial station, Time Highway Radio is the first), and the first to be based outside of Kuala Lumpur, in Johor Bahru, Johor, Malaysia. It began transmission in 1988 primarily as a station to suit the listening taste of the then Sultan of Johor, Almarhum Sultan Iskandar. It used to broadcast in both English and Malay, but fierce competition with other private stations broadcasting in English forced it to focus on the Malay speaking audience.

Its commercialisation began when it extended its broadcast area to outside its native Johor state and the commencement of round-the-clock broadcast in 1996. Best 104 was at one time one of the more popular bilingual stations with listeners in Singapore and the national capital Kuala Lumpur; stiff competition for the English speaking audience caused the station to stop its English broadcast in 2001. The main station is located in the royal town of Pasir Pelangi.

In February 2014, Best 104 has changed its name to Best FM.

Frequency

Facts 
 DJ Burhan Mohtaruddin, also known as BBD, held the world record of the longest on-air announcer after conducting the radio station non-stop for 104 hours, from midnight of 2 October 2000 until 8.00 a.m., 6 October 2000.

References

External links 
 

1988 establishments in Malaysia
Radio stations established in 1988
Radio stations in Malaysia
Mass media in Johor Bahru
Malay-language radio stations